Hypervigilance is a condition in which the nervous system is inaccurately filtering sensory information and the individual is in an enhanced state of sensory sensitivity. This appears to be linked to a dysregulated nervous system which can often be caused by traumatic events or PTSD. Normally, the nervous system releases stress signals (e.g. noradrenalin) in certain situations as a defense mechanism to protect one from perceived dangers. In some cases, the nervous system becomes chronically dysregulated, causing a release of stress signals that are inappropriate to the situation, creating inappropriate and exaggerated responses. Hypervigilance may bring about a state of increased anxiety which can cause exhaustion. Other symptoms include: abnormally increased arousal, a high responsiveness to stimuli, and a constant scanning of the environment.

In hypervigilance, there is a perpetual scanning of the environment to search for sights, sounds, people, behaviors, smells, or anything else that is reminiscent of activity, threat or trauma. The individual is placed on high alert in order to be certain danger is not near. Hypervigilance can lead to a variety of obsessive behavior patterns, as well as producing difficulties with social interaction and relationships.

Hypervigilance is differentiated from dysphoric hyperarousal in that the person remains cogent and aware of their surroundings. In dysphoric hyperarousal, a person with PTSD may lose contact with reality and re-experience the traumatic event verbatim. Where there have been multiple traumas, a person may become hypervigilant and suffer severe anxiety attacks intense enough to induce a delusional state where the effects of related traumas overlap. This can result in the thousand-yard stare.

Hypervigilance can be a symptom of post-traumatic stress disorder (PTSD) and various types of anxiety disorders. It is distinguished from paranoia. Paranoid diagnoses, such as can occur in schizophrenia, can seem superficially similar, but are characteristically different.

Symptoms
People suffering from hypervigilance may become preoccupied with scanning their environment for possible threats. They might 'overreact' to loud and unexpected noises, exhibit an overactive startle response or become agitated in highly crowded or noisy environments. They will often have a difficult time getting to sleep or staying asleep.  Sustained states of hypervigilance, lasting for a decade or more, may lead to higher sensitivity to disturbances in their local environment, and an inability to tolerate large gatherings or groups.  After resolution of the situation demanding their attention, people exhibiting hypervigilance may be exhausted and require time to 'recharge' before returning to normal activities.

See also
 Trauma trigger

References

Symptoms and signs of mental disorders
Post-traumatic stress disorder